Conosia is a genus of crane fly in the family Limoniidae.

Species
C. angustissima Alexander, 1927
C. insularis Alexander, 1942
C. irrorata (Wiedemann, 1828)
C. malagasya Alexander, 1921
C. minuscula Alexander, 1958
C. minusculoides Alexander, 1975
C. principalis Edwards, 1934
C. thomensis Edwards, 1934

References

Limoniidae
Nematocera genera